IPA Extensions may refer to:
 Extensions to the IPA, extra symbols to be used in conjunction with the IPA, designed for transcribing disordered speech, and occasionally used for transcribing normal speech 
 IPA Extensions Unicode block, a Unicode character block which encodes modern, historical, and proposed IPA symbols